Jason Szwimer (born December 20, 1991) sometimes mistakenly credited and known as Jason Szwimmer, is a Canadian voice actor. He was the voice of Dora Winifred Read on Arthur. He provided the voice of Elf in the Télétoon TV series Caillou's Holiday Movie and voiced Phil in the Teletoon TV series The Tofus.

He has developed a podcast, titled Finding D.W., wherein he looks for all of the actors who have voiced the character of D.W. Read.

Filmography
 Arthur, It's Only Rock and Roll – Dora Winifred "D.W." Read (2002)
 Arthur – Dora Winifred "D.W." Read (2002–2006)
 Caillou's Holiday Movie – Elf (2003)
 The Tofus – Phil (2004–2006)
 Postcards from Buster – Dora Winifred "D.W." Read (2004-2006)
 White Night – Kyle (2017)

References

External links
 
 Finding D.W. on Apple Podcasts

1991 births
Living people
Anglophone Quebec people
Canadian male voice actors
Male actors from Montreal